Arnold Thomas Green ( – 23 September 2016) was a New Zealand rugby league footballer who represented New Zealand.

Playing career
Green played for Runanga in the West Coast Rugby League competition and also represented the West Coast. In 1955 he played for the West Coast against France.

In 1956, Green impressed for the South Island during the inter-island selection match. He was subsequently selected by the New Zealand national rugby league team for their tour of Australia. He became Kiwi #364 and, while he did not play in any test matches, he played in seven of the 15 games on tour and scored seven tries.

Later years
Green was a coal miner who worked on the West Coast and in Huntly.

Green died at Coffs Harbour, New South Wales, Australia, on 23 September 2016, aged 83.

References

1930s births
2016 deaths
New Zealand rugby league players
New Zealand national rugby league team players
West Coast rugby league team players
Runanga players
South Island rugby league team players
Rugby league wingers
Rugby league centres